The Artsakh Revolutionary Party is an Armenian political party in Artsakh.

History
The Artsakh Revolutionary Party was established in December 2019, during a conference in Stepanakert. The party participated in the 2020 Artsakhian general election, 16 candidates were nominated to participate. However, the party decided not to nominate a presidential candidate. Artur Osipyan, a former lecturer at the Artsakh State University, was nominated to lead the party.

Prior to the election, the party organized a demonstration criticizing the decision to allow the election to proceed during the COVID-19 pandemic. Osipyan, also called on President Bako Sahakyan to resign.

Ideology
The Revolutionary Party of Artsakh supports conservative positions on a number of issues. The party believes in establishing a strong, democratic country that is based on the rule of law. The party has also called for economic reforms and fighting corruption.

Electoral record
Following the 2020 election, the party gained just 1.80% of the votes after the first round of voting. The party failed to gain any seats in the National Assembly and currently acts as an extra-parliamentary force.

Following the election, Osipyan claimed that Presidential winner Arayik Harutyunyan benefited from electoral violations.

See also

 List of political parties in Artsakh
 Politics of Artsakh

References

External links
 Artsakh Revolutionary Party Facebook page

Political parties in the Republic of Artsakh
Political parties established in 2019